Learning from Falling is the debut studio album by British singer-songwriter artist Lamya. The album included production by Nellee Hooper and Mark Ronson and entered the Top Heatseekers chart in the United States at #16.

A remix of the first single "Empires (Bring Me Men)" reached #1 on the Billboard Hot Dance/Club Play chart. The track "Black Mona Lisa" was covered by British R&B singer Maria Lawson on her eponymous album. A third single, "Never Enough", was only released as a promo.

All tracks were co-written by Lamya. "Pink Moon" is a cover of the Nick Drake song.

Track listing
 "Empires" (Lamya, Major) 5:07
 "East of Anywhere" (Lamya, Major) 3:57
 "Black Mona Lisa" (Lamya, Major) 4:22
 "Never Enough" (Lamya, Andres Levin, Camus Celli) 4:13
 "Judas Kiss (Brutus Diss)" (Lamya, Louis Metoyer, Justin Stanley) 3:49
 "Full Frontal Fridays" (Lamya, Major) 4:19
 "I Get Cravings" (Lamya, Stanley, Mark Ronson) 4:56
 "Splitting Atoms" (Lamya, Stanley, Ronson) 4:03
 "Never's Such a Long Time" (Lamya, Rick Nowels) 4:27
 "The Woman Who" (Lamya, Charles Stepney, Rudolph) 4:42
 "The Perfect Girl" (Lamya, Ronald Tomlinson, Don E.) 3:21 
 "Pink Moon" (Drake) 2:47
 "Black Mona Lisa (Single Mix)" (Lamya, Major) 4:10
 "Bed I Never Made" (Japanese bonus track)

Personnel

Musicians
Lamya: Vocals
Rusty Anderson, Lukasz Gottwald, Jimmy Hogarth, Teddy Kumpel, Manny Lopez, Adam Zimmon: Guitars
David Kahne: Bass, Keyboards, Programming
Sal Cuevas: Bass
Rick Nowels: Balalaika
Aloke Dasgupta: Sitar
Allan Gibson: Standup Bass
Abe Laboriel Jr., Shawn Pelton: Drums, Percussion
The Soulhusters: "Beats", Multi-Instruments
Ian Rossiter, Fabien Waltman: Programming

Strings
Chandru, Ralph Morrison, Sara Perkins, Marsha Skins: Violin
Karen Elaine Bakunin, Merlyn Sturt: Viola
Arranged & Conducted By Will Malone

References

2002 debut albums
Albums produced by David Kahne
Albums produced by Nellee Hooper
J Records albums
Lamya albums